Uzbek Julkhyr is a type of rug that was made primarily in Uzbekistan.

It is a long coarsely woven rug sleeping rug woven and was also made by the Uzbek north at the time in Afghanistan. They are similar in use and construction to old gabbeh carpets.

Uzbekistani rugs and carpets